Andrew Thomas Huang is a Chinese-American visual artist and film director known for his music videos for artists Björk, FKA twigs and Atoms for Peace. In 2019, Huang was nominated for a Grammy for his music video for FKA twigs - "Cellophane."

His films and videos have been commissioned by and exhibited at The Museum of Modern Art, NYC; MoMA PS1; The Sydney Opera House, Sydney; and the Museum of Contemporary Art, Los Angeles.

With his strength in world-building, Huang continues his foray into narrative with his first feature film Tiger Girl which has received support from Sundance and Film Independent. His narrative short "Kiss of the Rabbit God" premiered at Tribeca Film Festival 2019.

Huang graduated with a degree in Fine Art and Animation from the University of Southern California.

Videography

Music videos
 Björk - "Mutual Core" (2012)
 Atoms for Peace - "Before Your Very Eyes..." (2013)
 Sigur Rós - "Brennisteinn" (2013)
 Björk - "Black Lake" (2015)
 Björk - "Stonemilker" (2015)
 Björk - "The Gate" (2017)
 Kelela - "LMK" (2017)
 Perfume Genius - "Slip Away" (2017)
 serpentwithfeet - "bless ur heart" (2018)
 FKA Twigs - "Cellophane" (2019)
 Björk - "Ancestress" (2022)

Short films
 Doll Face (2005)
 Solipsist (2012)
 Interstice (2016)
 Flesh Nest (2017)
 Kiss of the Rabbit God (2019)
 Lily Chan and The Doom Girls (2020)
 Tiger Girl (2020)

References

Year of birth missing (living people)
Living people
American directors
American people of Chinese descent
Chinese artists
Chinese directors